Telangana Institute of Medical Sciences and Research, Hyderabad (Abbreviated TIMS, Hyderabad or TIMS or TIMSR) is a dedicated COVID-19 hospital in Telangana, India. It is later to be developed as a medical school and public hospital. The hospital came into existence with the issue of G.O.Ms.No. 22, Health, Medical and Family Welfare Department on 25 April 2020.


History 
In view of COVID-19 pandemic in India, it was decided by the Government of Telangana to establish a hospital in the Sports Hostel Building at G.M.C Balayogi Athletic Stadium, Gachibowli, Ranga Reddy District to provide health services. Pursuant to this decision, the Youth Advancement, Tourism and Culture Department has issued orders, transferred the Sports Village building at Gachibowli, along with appurtenant land of 9 Acres 16 Gunta, to the Health, Medical and Family Welfare Department to develop it as an exclusive COVID-19 Hospital to begin with and then to develop as a Multi–Specialty Hospital cum Premier Medical College.

References

Hospitals in Telangana
Hospitals established in 2020
COVID-19 pandemic in India